Martin David Burkenroad (March 20, 1910 – January 12, 1986) was an American marine biologist.  He specialized in decapod crustaceans and fisheries science.

Biography
Burkenroad was born in New Orleans in 1910 as the only child of coffee importer David Burkenroad and his artist wife Flora Salinger. His family contained many eccentrics, and Martin was similarly labeled "headstrong". He entered Tulane University in 1926, but although he published his first papers during that time, his studies ended when he was "'encouraged' to leave" in 1929. He then began working for the Carnegie Marine Biological Laboratory in the Dry Tortugas, before joining the Louisiana Department of Conservation in 1931, where he studied the local shrimp fishery. After brief spells at several museums, he joined Yale University under the guidance of A. E. Parr. Burkenroad spent many productive years at Yale, where the usual time limit for research for a dissertation was permanently waived for him, but he never submitted a dissertation.

Burkenroad left Yale in 1945 and was married to Marianne Algunde Schweitzer soon after. He became the chief biologist of the North Carolina Survey of Marine Fisheries, but fell out with his superiors, and so moved to Port Aransas to work at the marine facilities of the University of Texas. This was followed by what Burkenroad considered to be his most meaningful position, as a consultant on shrimp fishery to the governments of Panama and Costa Rica. Following a burst dam, however, Burkenroad's attempts to build a shrimp farm were thwarted. In the 1960s, Burkenroad and his family (his wife and three children) returned to New Orleans, where he worked in association with Tulane University. From 1978, he was affiliated with the San Diego Natural History Museum.

Work
Burkenroad's research interests were unusually broad, including astrophysics, Acheulean hand axes, and Lewis Carroll, as well as several fields of biology. In the world of fisheries science, he is best known for his radical views, first presented in 1947, on the history of Pacific halibut stocks. Contrary to the widely held view that conservation measures were responsible for reversing the species' decline, Burkenroad argued that a natural fluctuation was responsible, possibly related to cyclical environmental changes.

Burkenroad was highly critical even of his own work, although it was known for its soundness and reliability. His most famous carcinological paper was titled "The evolution of the Eucarida (Crustacea, Eumalacostraca), in relation to the fossil record", and was published in 1963. This revolutionized the classification of the order Decapoda; instead of a suborder Natantia and a suborder Reptantia, Burkenroad placed the Dendrobranchiata as the sister group to all remaining decapods, in a group he named Pleocyemata. The 1963 paper was intended only as a preliminary analysis, although its sequel would not appear for another 20 years.

Frederick R. Schram concluded his obituary of Burkenroad by stating that "Few individuals have had as great an effect on his science with so relatively few publications as has Martin Burkenroad". Burkenroad is commemorated in the names of several species, including Bentheogennema burkenroadi, "Metapenaeus burkenroadi" (a synonym of Metapenaeus moyebi) and Sicyonia burkenroadi.

Bibliography
According to his obituary, Burkenroad published over 50 scientific papers.

References

Further reading

External links
Martin Burkenroad papers, M-1283, Tulane University Archives and Special Collections
Finding aid to the Martin Burkenroad Collection, Online Archive of California.
 The San Diego Natural History Museum Research Library houses a significant collection of Martin Burkenroad's papers.

1910 births
1986 deaths
20th-century American zoologists
American marine biologists
American carcinologists
American cosmologists
Scientists from New Orleans
Tulane University alumni
Yale University alumni